Thonon-les-Bains station (French: Gare de Thonon-les-Bains) is a railway station located in Thonon-les-Bains, Haute-Savoie, south-eastern France. The station was opened in 1880 and is located on the Longeray-Léaz-Le Bouveret railway. The train services are operated by SNCF.

Train services
The following train services serve the station as of 2022:
High speed services (TGV inOui) Paris - Bellegarde - Annemasse - Évian-les-Bains
Regional services (TER Auvergne-Rhône-Alpes) (Lyon -) Bellegarde - Annemasse - Évian-les-Bains
Regional services (Léman Express) Coppet - Geneva - Annemasse - Évian-les-Bains

References

Railway stations in Haute-Savoie
Railway stations in France opened in 1880